Christian Pollack is an Austrian classical conductor.

Biography and career 
Pollack was born in Vienna, Austria, in 1946, where he studied violon, viola, piano and composition at the Conservatory and Musikhochschule. He trained as a conductor with Hans Swarowsky in Vienna, and, later, with Sergiu Celibidache in Munich. He has conducted with the Vienna Volksoper, since 1984, and was guest conductor of the Stuttgart Radio Symphony Orchestra in 1986.

Pollack has been the chief conductor of the East Slovakian Philharmonic, Košice since 1992, and the musical director of the Wiener Residenzorchester since 2005, as well as musical director of the opera class at the Vienna Conservatory Privat-University. Since September 2002 he has also been the principal guest conductor of the Žilina Chamber Orchestra in Slovakia. Pollack teaches at the Vienna Conservatory, and is working on a complete edition of the works of Johann Strauss II.

Pollack has made many recordings for the Marco Polo and Naxos labels, notably of classical Viennese music, such as the works of Johann Strauss I, Josef Strauss, Ziehrer, Suppé, and Karel Komzák II. His recordings include a number of discs in Naxos' complete Johann Strauss I and II editions.

References

External links
 Pollack's biography on the Naxos web site
 Pollack's biography on the Wiener Residenzorchester web site
 Biography on the Slovak Sinfionetta Žilina web site
 

Year of birth missing (living people)
Living people
Musicians from Vienna
Male conductors (music)
21st-century Austrian conductors (music)
21st-century male musicians